Jake Alexander Newton (born 9 June 1984) is a Guyanese footballer who plays as a right back for Folland Sports and the Guyana national team.

Early and personal life
Born in Hammersmith, London, England, Newton is the younger brother of fellow footballer Howard Newton.

Career

Club career
After spending five years with the Hampton & Richmond Borough youth team, Newton began his senior career in 2003 with Staines Town, and has also played for Chalfont St Peter, Bashley and Havant & Waterlooville. On 17 May 2018, Newton joined Wessex League side Hamble Club.

International career
Newton made his international debut for Guyana on 22 February 2008 in a friendly game against Cuba. To date, Newton has appeared in eleven international games for Guyana, although he has yet to feature in any World Cup Qualifying matches.

References

1984 births
Living people
Guyanese footballers
Guyana international footballers
English footballers
English people of Guyanese descent
Hampton & Richmond Borough F.C. players
Staines Town F.C. players
Chalfont St Peter A.F.C. players
Bashley F.C. players
Havant & Waterlooville F.C. players
Footballers from Hammersmith
Association football fullbacks
Folland Sports F.C. players
Hamble Club F.C. players
Winchester City F.C. players
Walton & Hersham F.C. players
Wessex Football League players